Rock Lake is a lake in Wright County, in the U.S. state of Minnesota.

Rock Lake was named for the boulders found near the lake's perimeter.

See also
List of lakes in Minnesota

References

Lakes of Minnesota
Lakes of Wright County, Minnesota